Róbert Richnák (born 3 May 1992) is a Slovak footballer who plays for Petržalka as a midfielder.

Club career
He made his league debut for Spartak Trnava against Dunajská Streda on 17 September 2013.

References

External links
Spartak Trnava profile

Corgoň Liga profile
Eurofotbal profile

1992 births
Living people
Slovak footballers
Association football midfielders
FC Spartak Trnava players
FK Železiarne Podbrezová players
ŠKF Sereď players
FC Petržalka players
Slovak Super Liga players
2. Liga (Slovakia) players
People from Hlohovec District
Sportspeople from the Trnava Region